The 7000-series is a series of rail car for the Chicago "L". The base order is for 400 cars and will be used to replace the 2600-series cars, dating back to the 1980s, which are currently assigned to the Blue, Brown, and Orange Lines. If the Chicago Transit Authority (CTA) ordered the additional 446 cars, these cars would replace the 3200-series cars, dating back to the early 1990s, which are currently assigned to the Blue and Brown Lines. Including all options, which is a total of 846 cars, the order will cost $1.3 billion.

The contract called for ten prototypes to be delivered by October 2019. If the rail cars prove to be acceptable, then full production cars would be delivered starting in October 2020, at a rate of 10 cars per month. The cost per car is approximately $1.58 million. Prototypes for testing were delivered in August 2020; the base order is to be delivered by 2024.

According to the CTA, when the 7000-series cars enter service, the Chicago "L" will have one of the youngest fleets of any U.S. transit system, with its fleet being an average of 13 years old. For comparison, the average age of rapid transit trains will be 27 years for Boston, 25 years for the District of Columbia, 22 years for New York City, and 18 years for San Francisco. Ten cars in the 7000-series began testing revenue service on April 21, 2021.

Features 
Each 7000-series rail car will feature 37 to 38 seats, and is a hybrid of the 3200-series and 5000-series. The 5000-series train cars are equipped with AC propulsion; interior security cameras, interior readouts, interior maps GPS, glow-in-the-dark evacuation signs, operator-controlled ventilation systems. AC propulsion allows for smoother acceleration, lower operational costs, less wear and tear, and greater energy efficiency. In particular, AC propulsion can take advantage of regenerative braking, meaning the train returns excess energy to the third rail as it slows down. LED screens give real-time transit information to passengers. LCD screens, installed near the doors, display real-time surveillance footage of riders in order to deter crime.

In the 7000-series, the design and arrangement of seats were modified to improve ergonomics and increase leg room. In addition, because the seats are attached to the side of the train using a diagonal pole rather than a vertical one to the floor, cleaning the train will be easier. However, seats will still be a combination of fabric and plastic. Compared to the 5000-series, there will be more front and back-facing seats. Enhanced air conditioning will circulate air more efficiently during hot summer days. Laser sensors above the doors will count the number of passengers, allowing the CTA to track passenger volumes and change its schedules accordingly.

Contracting and production 
On February 20, 2016, two finalists were announced for the contract—Canada's Bombardier Transportation and China's CRRC Sifang America. Bombardier was the manufacturer of the previous 5000-series cars. On March 9, 2016, the contract was awarded to CRRC Sifang America, with a bid that is $226 million lower than Bombardier's. However, on April 11, 2016, Bombardier filed a protest of the award, alleging that CTA rigged the procurement to give CRRC an unfair advantage. On September 28, 2016, the CTA finalized its decision to make CRRC Sifang America the manufacturer of the 7000-series cars.

The cars are being built at a new CRRC Sifang America rail car manufacturing plant at 13535 South Torrence Avenue in Chicago's Hegewisch neighborhood. Construction of the factory began in March 2017, with production to start at the factory in March 2019. CRRC invested $100 million on constructing the plant and $7.2 million on training its workforce of about 170 people. This is the first time in more than 50 years CTA rail cars are manufactured in Chicago. In June 2019, production began on the 7000-series cars. The rail cars will be manufactured over a period of more than 10 years. CRRC said it planned to use its Chicago factory to produce rapid transit rail cars for San Francisco and bi-level coach cars for Metra, a commuter rail operator serving Chicago metropolitan area, if it won contracts for these. Because CRRC was the only bidder, Metra once again asked competitors to present their proposals. However, in January 2021, Metra board approved Alstom as the builder for new bi-level coaches. CRRC has also placed bids for to produce rail cars for the Long Island Rail Road in New York and the Washington Metro. Beneath the train, there were 8,000 wires that need to be individually connected.

The contract required a test set to be delivered by October 2019. If the rail cars proved to be acceptable, then full production cars would be delivered starting in October 2020, at a rate of 10 cars per month. In December 2019, a set was seen testing at the facility. Prototypes for testing would be delivered in August 2020 and then the base order would be delivered by 2023 or 2024.

In August 2020, the first 7000-series rail cars arrived in Skokie Shops by semi truck. Testing began in October. The first 10 cars began testing in passenger service on April 21, 2021. In June 2022, delivery of the production cars began. In August 2022, the 7000-series production railcars began service.

CRRC controversy 
By law, 69% of each rail car must be US-sourced. Car shells are manufactured in China, transported by ships to Los Angeles or Houston, and then by trucks to Chicago to be completed at the CRRC Sifang America plant. CRRC is a Chinese state-owned enterprise; concerns have been raised over possible malware, cyber attacks, and mass surveillance by the Chinese government. However, the computer and software components and the automatic train control system will be made by American and Canadian firms. Of the 24 suppliers to the project, 19 have business headquarters in the U.S., and 16 of which have previously done business with the CTA. Moreover, the CTA reserves to right to supervise production and to halt the process if it sees fit. There will be no payments till the cars are received. Late deliveries will result in a fine of $300 per car per day.

Although CRRC has also been producing rapid transit trains for Boston, CTA Vice President for Purchasing Ellen McCormick said she was unsuccessful in obtaining information on the rail cars delivered to the Massachusetts Bay Transportation Authority.

In mid-2019, the United States Congress considered banning federal dollars from being spent on Chinese buses and trains due to concerns about unfair competition from state-sponsored firms, sabotage, and espionage. This is a stand-alone bill but is rather part of a national security bill passed by the House of Representatives. The Senate was considering the same proposal, but the bill died in committee. This measure has bipartisan support. It would prevent the company from taking further orders in the American market, but would not affect CRRC's current contract with the CTA.

See also 

 R211 (New York City Subway car)
 Toronto Rocket
 8000 series (Washington Metro)

References

External links 

 7000-series Rail Cars at the official website of the CTA.
 7000-series Cars at Chicago-L.org

Chicago "L" rolling stock
CSR Sifang Co Ltd.
CRRC multiple units
Train-related introductions in 2021